Jesús Carranza Neira was a Mexican colonel from Cuatro Ciénegas, Coahuila. He helped Benito Juárez and also lent him money.
Jesús Carranza was married to  María de Jesús Garza and had 15 children; among them was Venustiano Carranza, who later became President of Mexico.

The Veracruz town of Jesús Carranza was named in his honour.

See also
History of Mexico
Mexico

Year of birth missing
Year of death missing
Mexican military personnel
People from Cuatro Ciénegas
Military personnel from Coahuila